The King Wilki Morskie Szczecin are a Polish professional basketball team based in Szczecin, West Pomeranian, Poland. King Szczecin competes in the Polska Liga Koszykówki (PLK), the top tier level in Poland. The club was founded in 2004 and made its debut in the PLK in 2014.

Players

Current roster

Season by season

References 

Basketball teams in Poland